Karoly Patko (1895 - 1941 in Budapest) was a twentieth century Hungarian painter and copper engraver, noted for his nude paintings in a plastic presentation.

Patkó, studied in Budapest, was influenced by István Szőnyi and Vilmos Aba Novák who he worked with in the 1920s and 1930s. He visited Italy in 1923 influenced by art in Rome.

He produced many paintings throughout the 1930s and was a close friend of Erno Bank who painted his portrait on numerous occasions most notably the 1928 painting of him in the mirror. He died in 1941 only aged 46.

External links and sources 
 Fine Arts in Hungary

Artists from Budapest
1895 births
1941 deaths
20th-century Hungarian painters
Hungarian male painters
20th-century Hungarian male artists